The 2001–02 Israeli Noar Leumit League was the 8th season since its introduction in 1994 as the top-tier football in Israel for teenagers between the ages 18–20.

Maccabi Tel Aviv won the title, whilst Maccabi Netanya and Maccabi Herzliya were relegated.

Final table

External links
Noar Premier League 01-02 One.co.il 

Israeli Noar Premier League seasons
Youth